Cavour (from the Piedmontese toponym, Cavor) is a comune (municipality) in the Metropolitan City of Turin in the Italian region Piedmont, located about  southwest of Turin.

Cavour borders the following municipalities: Macello, Vigone, Bricherasio, Garzigliana, Villafranca Piemonte, Campiglione-Fenile, Bibiana, Bagnolo Piemonte, Barge.

History

Its ancient Roman name was Caburrum or Forum Vibii. Cavour lies on the north side of a huge isolated mass of granite (the Rocca di Cavour) which rises from the plain. On the summit was the Roman village, which belonged to the province of the Alpes Cottiae. There are some ruins of medieval fortifications. The town gave its name to the Benso family of Chieri, who were raised to the marquisate in 1771, and of which the statesman Cavour was a member.

People 
Camillo Benso, conte di Cavour
Mauro Picotto

References

Cities and towns in Piedmont